The Library  may refer to:

 Bibliotheca historica, also known as The Library, a work by Diodorus Siculus
 The Library (journal), a publication of the Bibliographical Society
 The Library (film), a 2013 Thai short film
 The Library (play), a 2014 play directed by Steven Soderbergh
 "The Library" (Seinfeld), an episode of the television series Seinfeld
 "The Library" (Avatar: The Last Airbender), an episode of the television series Avatar: The Last Airbender
 The Library, a World Fantasy Award-winning 2002 novella by Zoran Živković
 The Library (Halo), a level in the video game Halo: Combat Evolved

See also
 Library
 Bibliotheca (Pseudo-Apollodorus), a collection of Greek mythology and legends